Meliola brevispora is a species of fungus in the family Meliolaceae. It was first described in 1987 by Marie Farr, from a specimen found on the leaves of a plant in the family, Guttiferae, in Brazil.

References

Meliolaceae
Fungi described in 1987
Fungi of Brazil
Taxa named by Marie Leonore Farr